Sheahan station is a shelter flag stop Via Rail station located in Sheahan, Ontario, Canada on the Sudbury – White River train.

External links
 Via Rail page for Sheahan train station

Via Rail stations in Ontario
Railway stations in Sudbury District